Royal Quays is an area of North Shields, North Tyneside, England, beside the River Tyne.

Built on the site of former docks, and containing the pre-existing North Shields International Ferry Terminal, the area was renamed Royal Quays in 1990 and redeveloped with housing, a shopping centre, Brewers Fayre restaurant, large public parks and a water park known as Wet n Wild. A Premier Inn hotel, sports centre, ten-pin bowling complex and a trampolining centre are also part of the development.

History 

The area is centred on the Albert Edward Dock which now houses the Royal Quays Marina.

Transport 

The nearest Metro stations are Meadow Well and Percy Main which with local bus routes 10,11 and 317 serve the area. In addition to the North Shields International Ferry Terminal, cruise ships regularly dock at the Port of Tyne terminal. A car and lorry terminal is adjacent.

Royal Quays Outlet Centre
Royal Quays Outlet Centre, officially known as Royal Quays Outlet & Independent Centre is an outlet centre in Royal Quays, North Shields.

The centre has been used by the BBC to film scenes for children's programmes and ITV for an episode of VeraVera %28TV series%29in July 2022.

References

External links 
Official Website

Shopping centres in Tyne and Wear
Buildings and structures in the Metropolitan Borough of North Tyneside
North Shields